Ficarolo is a comune (municipality) in the Province of Rovigo in the Italian region Veneto, located about  southwest of Venice and about  southwest of Rovigo.

Ficarolo borders the following municipalities: Bagnolo di Po, Bondeno,  Ferrara, Gaiba, Salara, Sermide e Felonica.

References

External links
Official website

Cities and towns in Veneto